The Voice of the People Party abbreviated PVP (Arabic: حزب صوت الشعب‎) or simply Voice of the People, is an Algerian political party licensed in 2019. It is led by Lamine Osmanie, a former member of the Algerian National Front.

Electoral results

Legislative elections

Council of the Nation elections

References

See also 

 List of political parties in Algeria

Political parties in Algeria
Political parties established in 2019
2019 establishments in Algeria
Conservative parties in Algeria